Sergeant Cornelius Francis Adjetey (died 28 February 1948) was a Ghanaian ex-serviceman and veteran of World War II. He was one of the three veterans shot dead by Major Imray while on their way to present a petition to Sir Gerald Creasy who was Governor of Gold Coast at the time. The death of these three ex-servicemen led to the 1948 Accra Riots.

Biography 
Cornelius Francis Adjetey fought for the British Empire during World War II as a citizen of the Gold Coast Colony. He died on 28 February 1948 when he, along with two other veterans, were killed. The three veterans were shot dead by Major Imray while they were on their way to present a petition to the Governor of the Gold Coast, Gerald Creasy. According to a tribute written to Adjetey, prior to their deaths, there was a boycott on "Whiteman goods". The reason behind the boycott was to register dissent toward the manner in which the white man treated an African. On 28 February 1948, a negotiated price reduction of the inflated goods was to come into effect and the boycott was to be called off. A deputation, group of people appointed to undertake a mission or a formal process on behalf of a bigger group, of unarmed ex-servicemen, led by sergeant Adjetey and others were fired upon and attacked by police on their way to present the petition to the Governor at Osu Castle. Adjetey and the two other veterans, Corporal Patrick Attipoe and Private Odartey Lamptey, all fought bravely in the second World War with the allied forces. A tribute states that certain promises were made to the veterans because of their service. Such promises included better treatment and for their voices to be heard. However, these veterans and other ex-servicemen were protesting and bringing the petition to Osu Castle because those promises were not kept.

The news of the murder of the three veterans spread widely and quickly and added fuel to the turmoil that was already going on about the corrupt government. The people took to looting and burning the shops of European companies, which actions were known as the "Accra riots". Those who masterminded the boycott were the Joint Provincial Council Chiefs, a council created to strengthen the position of the traditional chiefs during colonial times. Law and order broke down in Accra and other parts of the country, these events were also known as "the 1948 disturbances". The boycott was very successful and was observed throughout the country. These events encouraged the anti-colonial movements to pressure the British government to institute a committee to investigate the killings and all the wrongdoings. The committee recommended self-government for the Gold Coast which eventually led to the country gaining its independence on 6 March 1957. The death of Cornelius Francis Adjetey along with the other two veterans sparked a lot of necessary conflict within the government. These conflicts were necessary because they caused change in the government. Their importance is documented because of the change that their lives caused. Till this day Ghanaians mark the anniversary of the 28 February 1948 crossroads shooting incident in remembrance of the three gallant, defenceless ex-servicemen who were murdered in cold bold while protesting peacefully.

References

1948 deaths
Year of birth missing